Im Geum-ja (born 20 April 1947) is a South Korean former freestyle swimmer. She competed in two events at the 1964 Summer Olympics.

References

External links
 

1947 births
Living people
South Korean female freestyle swimmers
Olympic swimmers of South Korea
Swimmers at the 1964 Summer Olympics
Place of birth missing (living people)